George Edward Yonge (4 July 1824 – 27 December 1904) was an English amateur cricketer who played first-class cricket from 1844 to 1853. His elder brother was Charles Duke Yonge.

A fast roundarm bowler (unknown hand) who was mainly associated with Oxford University, he made 26 known appearances in first-class matches and took 146 wickets.  He played for the Gentlemen in the Gentlemen v Players series.

He married 6 October 1859, at St Georges Bloomsbury, Lucy, daughter of Gideon Acland of Tiverton, Devon. Barrister Middle Temple 1853  and later Treasurer of  Southampton (Hants)  County. One son, George Acland,  who  was born on 23rd Sept 1868 and died 6 October 1870. He died 8 December 1904. at Stoke Lodge, Bishopstoke Eastleigh in Hampshire.

George is incorrectly called Gerald on many web sites.

References

1824 births
1904 deaths
English cricketers
English cricketers of 1826 to 1863
Oxford University cricketers
Gentlemen of England cricketers
Gentlemen cricketers
Non-international England cricketers
North v South cricketers
Over 30s v Under 30s cricketers
Oxford and Cambridge Universities cricketers
Alumni of Trinity College, Oxford